Giuseppe Ravano (born 5 February 1943) is an Italian equestrian and Olympic champion. He won a team gold medal in eventing at the 1964 Summer Olympics in Tokyo.

References

1943 births
Living people
Olympic equestrians of Italy
Italian male equestrians
Equestrians at the 1964 Summer Olympics
Equestrians at the 1968 Summer Olympics
Olympic gold medalists for Italy
Italian event riders
Olympic medalists in equestrian
Medalists at the 1964 Summer Olympics